

Wulfsige (or Wulsy; died 1053) was a medieval Bishop of Lichfield.

Wulfsige was consecrated in 1039 and died in 1053. Little else is known about him or his background.

Citations

References

External links
 

11th-century English Roman Catholic bishops
1053 deaths
Anglo-Saxon bishops of Lichfield
Year of birth unknown